Antaeotricha aerinotata is a moth in the family Depressariidae. It was described by Arthur Gardiner Butler in 1877. It is found in Brazil (Amazonas).

The wingspan is about 24 mm. The forewings are greyish-brown, the external half of the cell, the area beyond it, and a transverse patch placed at right angles to it and parallel to the inferior extremity of the outer margin, pale brassy-green. There is also a blackish dot at the end of cell. The hindwings are shining brown.

References

Moths described in 1877
aerinotata
Taxa named by Arthur Gardiner Butler
Moths of South America